José Skinner (born 1956) is an American writer of short stories, essays, journalism, translations and book reviews.

Early life and education 
José Skinner was born in Río Piedras, Puerto Rico and grew up in Mexico City. He attended the Universidad Iberoamericana and worked as a Spanish-English interpreter and translator in the courts of New Mexico before earning his MFA in fiction at the Iowa Writers' Workshop.

Career 
He taught creative writing and directed the bilingual MFA program at the University of Texas–Pan American in the Lower Rio Grande Valley. He has been a fellow at the Virginia Center for the Creative Arts and was inducted into the Texas Institute of Letters in 2018.

His first collection, Flight and Other Stories, was a Barnes & Noble Discover Great New Writers selection and a finalist for the Western States Book Award for Fiction and the Drue Heinz Literature Prize. Publishers Weekly called the collection "varied, well-crafted and frequently daring." Latino Literature Hall of Fame member Luis Alberto Urrea said, "José Skinner’s got a book called Flight. He’s my great hope. There’s something really remarkable and grand going on in his work, his fiction."

Of his second collection, The Tombstone Race, Kirkus Reviews said, "With verisimilitude, compassion, and a surprising amount of nobility, Skinner navigates the mean streets of New Mexico with cunning and grace." Latina Magazine wrote, "The authenticity of José Skinner's experiences as a Spanish/English interpreter in the courtrooms of the Southwest hit harder than an NFL linebacker." In Western American Literature, Melina Vizcaíno-Alemán wrote, "By carefully balancing an artistic appreciation of the landscape with an awareness of social reality, Skinner presents a thought- provoking collection about a diverse people and place mired in regional development." Rigoberto González of NBC News wrote, "José Skinner's long-awaited second collection measures up to, and indeed surpasses, his critically-acclaimed debut 'Flight and Other Stories." The book was a Writers' League of Texas Discovery Prize Winner in 2016.

His fiction has appeared in Witness, Third Coast, Colorado Review, and many other literary magazines, and his nonfiction in Our Lost Border: Essays on Life Amid the Narco-Violence, Monthly Review, The Progressive, El Nuevo Mexicano, and The Millennium Reader. He has reviewed books for The Texas Observer and American Book Review.

Bibliography

Books 

Flight and Other Stories (Reno: University of Nevada Press, 2001)

The Tombstone Race (Albuquerque: University of New Mexico Press, 2016)

Selected Stories 

"Peons." Isthmus 6, 2017 (Distinguished Story of 2017, Best American Short Stories)

"Looking Out" and "The Edge" Solstice Literary Magazine 2010, 2012 Looking Out The Edge

"Plots" The Florida Review36:1, 2011 (Finalist, Florida Review Award in Fiction)

"Crypto" Other Voices 44, 2006

"Counting Coup" Clackamas Literary Review Vol X, 2006

"The Extra" Third Coast 21, 2005

"Age of Copper" Witness 15.1, 2001

"Careful" Boulevard 31.1-2, 2000

"Backing Up" Colorado Review 27.2, 2000

"Cop" Bilingual Review/Revista Bilingüe 25.2, 2000

"Mentor" Red Rock Review 1.5, 1999

"Weeds" Western Humanities Review 52.2, 1998

"Hands" Blue Mesa Review 10, 1998

"Lockjaw" Quarterly West 45, 1998

"Pickup" Descant 34.1, 1995

"Spring." Saguaro 9, 1994. Reprinted in translation in Tameme: New Literature of North America/Nueva Literatura de Norteamérica 3, 2003

"Boxed in by Borges." Coe Review 25th Anniversary Special Experimental Issue

Stories in Anthologies 

"The Edge." In Sol Lit Selects: Five Years of Diverse Voices, 2018  Solstice Literary Magazine's selection of the best writing published in its first five years.

"All About Balls." In Las Vegas Noir (New York: Akashic Books, 2008)

"Naked City." In In the Shadow of the Strip: Las Vegas Stories (Reno: University of Nevada Press, 2003)

"Qué Será." In Sol: English Writing in Mexico (San Miguel de Allende: Sol, 2012)

"Sus Canciones." In Antología Canicular (McAllen: Campamocha Editora, 2009)

References

External links 
 Works by José Skinner in Libraries Skinner, JoseÌ 1956- [WorldCat Identities]
 Author’s Website
 A Conversation with José Skinner in Solstice Literary Magazine
 Toxic Machismo, Identity, and Heritage in the Southwest – An Interview with Jose Skinner
 Interview with José Skinner in the Colorado Review
 Story Collection Set in New Mexico, but Transcends Regionalism in the Austin American Statesman
 The Tombstone Race: Stories by José Skinner in Pasatiempo | The Santa Fe New Mexican
 The Tombstone Race: Stories Colorado State University Center for Literary Publishing
 On Jose Skinner’s "Que Sera" Write By Night 
 International Writing Program, University of Iowa
 Texas Author’s Tales Explore the Human Condition and Many NM Cities, Towns in Albuquerque Journal
 Superior Firepower in Wraparound South

1956 births
Living people
Iowa Writers' Workshop alumni
People from Río Piedras, Puerto Rico
University of Texas–Pan American alumni
Universidad Iberoamericana alumni